The Leeward Passage is a channel between Hans Lollik Island and northern St. Thomas Island in the United States Virgin Islands in the West Indies. It is one of the smallest channels in the US.

References

West Indies
Bodies of water of the United States Virgin Islands
Straits of the Caribbean